Albany High School was a four-year secondary school located in Albany, Georgia, United States. It was a part of the Dougherty County School System and educated students in grades 9-12.

Albany High School was established in 1886 after H.M. McIntosh, editor of the Albany News and Advertiser, initiated a campaign to raise the funds necessary to erect the school. It was the first high school in the county.

Two years after the school opened, it was destroyed by a fire of unknown origin.  Classes were temporarily held in the town courthouse while the academy was rebuilt.

Student enrollment rapidly increased during the first two decades.  Overcrowding led to expansion and a new building was constructed in 1908.  Located at the intersection of Monroe Street and Society Avenue, it contained ten classrooms.  In 1925, the high school moved to 1000 North Jefferson Street and in the fall of 1954, it relocated to Residence Avenue.

On June 6, 2017, the Dougherty County School System voted to close the school after summer classes finished.  Rising seniors were allowed to choose to attend any one of the three remaining high schools.

Academics

In the fall of 1999, a Magnet Honors Program was added to the curriculum.

School athletics

Basketball
The boys' basketball team was coached by Archie Chatmon for more than 30 years, during which time he accrued a winning 56%.  Coach Chatmon appeared in two State Championship games, both lost to their crosstown rival, Westover, in 1990 and 1993.

Football
The school won one State Championship, in 1959.

Baseball
The 1996 team was considered the best team in school history. The team went 24-0 in the regular season (Region 1-AAA Champions).  Albany High was swept in a best of 3 by Hardaway, (they defeated Hardaway twice in the regular season) in the second round of the AAA State Playoffs. The Indians baseball team finished the 1996 season at 26-2.

School stadium
Hugh Mills Stadium was dedicated to Hugh M. Mills, the school's principal from 1923-1925. The stadium was located near the school, at 601 North Van Buren Street.  It was used by teams from all four public high schools: the Albany Indians (now closed), Dougherty Trojans, Monroe Tornadoes, and Westover Patriots football and track teams. It was also the host of the girls' state track meet for all five GHSA classifications.

Albany High was the only school in the Dougherty County School System to have an on-site football stadium, so all the high schools in Dougherty County used Hugh Mills as a home field. To alleviate confusion during games between schools, signs were posted at each of the entrance gates to designate the home team. If the three schools have home games on the same weekend, games were played on Thursday, Friday, and Saturday nights.

Extracurricular activities

 Academic Decathlon
 Art Club - The Art Club was involved in many community projects, including the Kiwanis Club art show and the Martin Luther King Jr. art show. The Art Club met several times each year and assisted in readying projects for shows.
 Band - The school's marching band was known as the Marching Chiefs. They were invited to several bowl games and marching invitationals and received, at a minimum, "Excellent" ratings at many marching festivals and competitions. The Chiefs finished the 2009 marching season with two best in class trophies. At the Blue and Grey Invitational, the Chiefs placed third in competition and best in class and division, band, danceline, and drum majors.  The Chiefs received "Superior" ratings in all captions of marching (excluding color guard and drumline) at the Blue and Grey Marching Invitational. At that same competition, the drumline and color guard received an excellent rating, along with best in class and division awards.  At the Sound of Silver Marching Invitational, the Chiefs received "Superior" ratings in both Festival and Competition for all captions of marching. The band and the danceline beat nine other bands in their class, to be named Best in Class (AA). The AHS Marching Chiefs was noted as the Reserve Grand Champion Band at Sound of Silver, outscoring 20 other bands. The Albany High Marching Chiefs competed again in the Sound of Silver Invitational in Blackshear, Georgia on October 16, 2010, where they won the title of Grand Champion and Best in Class AAA band, drum major, drumline, and color guard. The symphonic band earned all superiors at the GMEA District 2 LGPE a number of years. Some members of the program participated in the Dougherty County Honor Band and the GMEA District 2 Honor Band.
 Beta Club - The Beta Club sponsored scholarships and the Miss AHS Pageant. To be a member, a student was required to maintain a "B" average.
 Block A - This group was for students who earned a letter for sports agility and musical or academic ability.
 Chorus - The Albany High Chorale received superior ratings in the GMEA festival beginning in 2011-2012. They participated in the Southern Star Music Festival, where they received "Superior" ratings. The Chorale played a major role in Albany by participating in the Albany State University homecoming parade and performing at schools, churches, and the annual Peppermint Pops concert presented by the Albany Symphony Orchestra. In 2011, the chorale served as an opening act to comedian Bill Cosby.  Their motto was "Why do we sing? It's our passion."
 DECA - Members of DECA learned marketing and career objectives and research different marketing areas, such as retail or hospitality management, in order to compete in regional, state, and international competitions.
 Drama Club - The Drama Club was involved in the One-Act Play Competition Festival. Other projects on the itinerary were community-oriented, geared to entertaining the elderly and youth during holidays.
 Dream Weavers - This club maintained the AHS webpage, updating activities for classes and organizations.
 Excel Club  - This community-oriented service organization was involved in projects such as collecting food donations at Thanksgiving and Christmas and working in conjunction with the Albany Exchange Club at the fair.
 FCA -  Better known as the Fellowship of Christian Students, this group provided Christian fellowship opportunities. FCA met on Tuesday mornings for prayer and devotionals. The group also met periodically at the flagpole for prayer. The club was affiliated with the Salvation Army.
 FCCLA - The Family, Career and Community Leaders of America group was involved in leadership training and Power of One, as well as personal development training and competition.
 Future Business Leaders of America
 French Club
 HOSA - The Health Occupations Students of America, the official organization of HST students around the country, taught the importance of dedication, leadership, and worked with the community to improve health awareness.
 Japanese Club -  Organized to expand students' awareness of Japanese language and culture, the club sponsored several Japanese festivals. It was an offshoot of the Satellite Education Resources Consortium. Classes were conducted through TV instruction and phone conferences.
 JGG - Jobs for Georgia's Graduates was a school-to-work transition program for seniors, preparing students for the world of work and higher education.
 Key Club
 Literary Team - This team promoted interest in dramatic interpretation, spelling, extemporaneous speaking, writing, and singing (solo and trio). The team represented the school at the regional and state literary competitions.
 Math Team - Students who excelled in mathematics courses met every month to take a six-question test which was scored statewide. Selected members composed the team which competed on the regional and state level. Some of the competitions were held at Darton State College and Georgia Southwestern State University.
 Mock Trial
 Orchestra - Students practiced and performed with the Dougherty County Youth Symphony Orchestra at concerts throughout the year.
 PowWow - This was the student newspaper.
 Short Circuits - This club organized props, lighting, and sound for pageants, dance recitals, band recitals, and assemblies.
 Spanish Club - The club promoted interest in studying Spanish-speaking language and culture. It participated in the Light the Night Leukemia Walk, Adopt-a-Family for Thanksgiving Dinner, and other service projects.
 Student Advisory Council - This council, which consisted of all the presidents of school organizations, provided assistance and advice to clubs and organizations when problems arose, working under the leadership of the principal.
 Student Council - This voiced the views of the students on many issues, including the promotion of school spirit, good student relations, community service, and the democratic process. Student Council sponsored Homecoming week activities, blood drives, and other activities.
 TASCO - The Teenage Support Council consisted of teens helping people through difficult times. Throughout the year, TASCO promoted communications to help struggling teens. TASCO sponsored Red Ribbon Week, Asthma Walk, and Toys for Tots. They worked with their community group, Lung Association. TASCO's motto was, "We're ears to our peers."
 VICA (Skills USA) - Vocational Industrial Clubs Of America was a work-study program that allowed students to have part-time jobs and be graded on their work performance by their supervisors.  Students could leave school early as long as they maintained a job.

School traditions

Events
Annual Day - Annuals (yearbooks) were distributed during May at an assembly at which the annual was dedicated. Students were given the opportunity to sign other students' annuals during most classes.
Awards Day - A spring awards program presented academic awards and some scholarships. This was an evening affair to which recipients of awards and their parents were invited. Refreshments were served following the program.
Class Day - This was a rite of passage for graduating seniors. The student body of AHS assembled in the auditorium to view  the extravagant entrance and exit of seniors, presentations, and senior skits. Near the end of Class Day, the juniors were allowed to move from the "junior section" to the "senior section," as a sort of "graduation" from 11th grade to 12th grade.
Homecoming Week - Every day of the week a special theme was seen throughout the school.  On Friday, there was the traditional homecoming football game, where the homecoming court was introduced at halftime or after the game. On Saturday night, the traditional homecoming dance occurred, at which the queen and king were announced based on the vote of the student body.
Miss AHS Pageant - Juniors or seniors were eligible to enter the pageant. The Beta Club sponsored the contest annually during the fall. Each club nominated a girl to represent it. Miss AHS reigned over the school the rest of the year. Proceeds from the contest were used for scholarships sponsored by the Beta Club.
Mr. AHS Pageant - This was similar to the Miss AHS pageant except that the contestants were male. The contestants were sponsored by TASCO and the winner received a $100 scholarship (also presented by TASCO) and the title "Mr. AHS."
Senior Week - The seniors were congratulated and rewarded for their hard work throughout their high school career. Senior bowling night, the senior picnic, and the senior breakfast were some of the events that catered to seniors at Albany High. Class Day ended Senior Week.

Alma mater
(To the tune of "You're a Grand Old Flag")

Notable alumni 
 Danny Breeden, former professional baseball player (Cincinnati Reds, Chicago Cubs)
 Hal Breeden, former professional baseball player (Chicago Cubs, Montreal Expos)
 Paula Deen, chef and host of the Paula's Home Cooking television show on the Food Network
 Jim Fowler, animal expert and host of the quadruple Emmy Award-winning wildlife television show Mutual of Omaha's Wild Kingdom
 Edward "Skip" Gnehm, United States ambassador to Jordan, Australia and Kuwait; visiting professor at The George Washington University
 Chris Jansen, poet and translator of the Persian poet Rumi and Nobel Prize Winner Pablo Neruda
 Colonel John King, former Brigade Commander of the 48th Infantry Brigade Combat Team, Georgia National Guard
 Bart Oates, former NFL center and Super Bowl champion with the New York Giants and San Francisco 49ers
 Ray Stevens, country music singer
 Jodie Whire, NFL player
 Alexander Wright, former NFL football player with the Dallas Cowboys, Los Angeles Raiders and St. Louis Rams
 Juwon Young, NFL player

References
 National Center for Education Statistics School Profile: Albany High School. 2003. National Center for Education Statistics. 7 May 2005 
 Thronateeska 2005. Volume 86. Albany, Georgia: Albany High School, 2005. 1-192.
 Thronateeska Heritage Center
 DCSS votes to close Albany High, effective immediately

External links
 Albany High Times — alumni website
 Albany High website

Public high schools in Georgia (U.S. state)
Educational institutions established in 1886
Educational institutions disestablished in 2017
Schools in Dougherty County, Georgia
Buildings and structures in Albany, Georgia
1886 establishments in Georgia (U.S. state)
2017 disestablishments in Georgia (U.S. state)